Lamphelpat (Meitei pronunciation: /ləm.pʰel.pát/) is the district headquarter of Imphal West district in the state of Manipur, India. It is a suburb of Imphal city.

Etymology 
The name "Lamphelpat" (/ləm.pʰel.pát/) is made up of two Meitei language words, "Lamphel" and "Pāt". "Lamphel" (/ləm.pʰel/) is the Meitei name of a place in Imphal. "Pāt" (/pát/) means lake in Meitei.

References

Cities and towns in Imphal West district